Kvernafjord is a small fjord next to the island of Flatøy and just west of the village of Knarvik in Alver Municipality in Vestland county, Norway. The fjord lies between the Radfjord, which is part of the same fjord system, and the sound Hagelsund, which creates a link to the southeast, where Salhusfjord meets Osterfjord. The strait Alverstraum lies to the east, creating a connection to the village of Alversund.

At the south end of the fjord, European route E39 crosses the Hagelsund over the  Hagelsund Bridge.

See also
 List of Norwegian fjords

References

External links
Kvernafjord at Norgeskart

Lindås
Meland
Fjords of Vestland